Sanay Min (lit. "Saturday King";  1 April 1673 – ) was the 13th king of Toungoo dynasty of Burma (Myanmar) who reigned from 1698 to 1714. Sanay ascended to throne after his father Minye Kyawhtin died in 1698. Sanay was - like his father - ineffectual, and the power of Toungoo dynasty continued to decline.

Early life
Sanay Min was born to King Minye Kyawhtin and his queen Sanda Dewi (née Khin Ma Shwe San Oo) c. April 1673. He was given Dabayin in fief, and was known as Debayin Mintha in his youth. He was made heir apparent on 8 September 1688 (Wednesday, 14th waxing of Tawthalin 1050 ME).

Notes

References

Bibliography
 
 
 
 

Rulers of Toungoo
1714 deaths
1673 births
18th-century Burmese monarchs
17th-century Burmese monarchs